Karl Andreas Taube (born September 14, 1957)  is an American Mesoamericanist, Mayanist, iconographer and ethnohistorian, known for his publications and research into the pre-Columbian cultures of Mesoamerica and the American Southwest.  he holds a position as Professor of Anthropology at the College of Humanities, Arts, and Social Sciences,  University of California, Riverside.  In 2008 he was named the College of Humanities, Arts, and Social Sciences distinguished lecturer.

Family Background
Karl Taube's father, Canadian-born Henry Taube (d. 2005), whose parents were ethnic Germans, was the recipient of the 1983 Nobel Prize in chemistry.

Education
Taube commenced his undergraduate education at Stanford, relocating to Berkeley where he completed a B.A. in Anthropology in 1980. His graduate studies were undertaken in Anthropology at Yale, where he completed his Masters degree in 1983 and was awarded his Doctorate in 1988. At Yale, Taube studied under several notable Mayanist researchers, including Michael D. Coe, Floyd Lounsbury and the art historian Mary Miller. Taube later co-authored with Miller a well-received encyclopaedic work, The Gods and Symbols of Ancient Mexico and the Maya.

Career
Field research undertaken during the course of his career include a number of assignments on archaeological, linguistic and ethnological projects conducted in the Chiapas highlands, Yucatán Peninsula, central Mexico, Honduras and most recently, Guatemala. As of 2003, Taube has served as Project Iconographer for the Proyecto San Bartolo, co-directed by William Saturno and Monica Urquizu. His primary role was to interpret the murals of Pinturas Structure Sub-1, dating to the first century B.C. In 2004, Taube co-directed an archaeological project documenting previously unknown sources of "Olmec Blue" jadeite in eastern Guatemala. Taube has also investigated pre-Columbian sites in Ecuador and Peru.

Themes
Taube's two most important books are "The Major Gods of Ancient Yucatan" (1992) and "Olmec Art at Dumbarton Oaks" (2004). The former one restudied the Maya deities of the three codices and aligned them with the deities of the Classic Period. The two-part study of the San Bartolo murals (2005, 2010), although listing several authors, could be considered his third main publication, in asfar as it concerns the Late-Preclassic iconography of the  maize god and the hero Hunahpu.

An early theme examined by Taube concerns the agricultural development and symbolism of Mesoamerica. A prime example of this is his 1983 presentation to the Fifth Palenque Round Table identifying the Maya maize god and resulting in one of his major articles (1985). Taube has also written on the symbolism and deity associations of maize for other cultures, particularly in his brilliant study of "Lightning Celts and Corn Fetishes" (2000) that connects Olmec maize symbolism with the American Southwest.

Underlying much of Taube's work is his interest in inter– and intra-regional exchanges and contacts between Mesoamerica, Aridoamerica and the American Southwest. An example of the latter was already mentioned; to this could be added his influential 2004 article on the so-called "Flower Mountain", turning on concepts of life, beauty, and Paradise among the Classic Maya.

Taube also researched the interactions between Teotihuacan, a dominant center in Mexico's plateau region during the Classic era of Mesoamerican chronology, and contemporary Maya polities.

Following Taube's sixtieth birthday in 2017, his collected articles in Mesoamerican, especially Mayan, iconography have begun to appear with the Precolumbia Mesoweb Press and online.

Notes

References

External links

Archaeological tours
Taube leads educational journeys for Far Horizons Archaeological and Cultural trips
 Taube's tour page Karl Taube

Mesoamerican archaeologists
Mesoamerican anthropologists
Mayanists
Andean scholars
American Mesoamericanists
American anthropologists
University of California, Riverside faculty
1957 births
Living people
Teotihuacan scholars
20th-century Mesoamericanists
21st-century Mesoamericanists
Stanford University alumni
University of California, Berkeley alumni
Yale University alumni
American people of German descent